3D1 may refer to:
 Crivitz Municipal Airport, an airport located in Wisconsin
 Panasonic Lumix DMC-3D1, digital camera made by Panasonic